SS Berlin was a freight vessel built for the Yorkshire Coal and Steamship Company in 1891.

History

She was built by Thompson of Dundee. for the Yorkshire Coal and Steamship Company. In 1895 the company was taken over by the Goole Steam Shipping Company which in turn was acquired by the Lancashire and Yorkshire Railway in 1905.

In 1914 she was in Copenhagen at the outbreak of the First World War and it was decided to leave her there for safety. However, pressure for tonnage required that she leave that port in 1916 under disguise and she crossed the North Sea to Hull, where she was renamed River Ribble.

In 1922 she became the property of the London and North Western Railway and in 1923, the London, Midland and Scottish Railway.

On 29 November 1931, River Ribble collided with the British steamer  at Hamburg, Germany, and was beached at Altona. She was refloated the next day. Selby suffered severe damage.

River Ribble was sold to J.J. King of Garston and scrapped in September 1933 at Gateshead.

References

Bibliography

1891 ships
Steamships of the United Kingdom
Ships built in Dundee
Ships of the Lancashire and Yorkshire Railway
Ships of the London and North Western Railway
Ships of the London, Midland and Scottish Railway
Maritime incidents in 1931